Jana Mashonee, (born Jana; May 11, 1982), better known by her stage name, Jana, is an American singer, songwriter, actress, author and philanthropist. She is originally from Robeson County, North Carolina. Jana is a two-time Grammy nominee and nine-time Nammy winner. Her music is steeped in R&B and gospel roots, which introduced her to the mainstream.

Early life
Jana was born May 11, 1982, and is from Robeson County, North Carolina; although she grew up in Charlotte, North Carolina. Jana is a Native American of Lumbee and Tuscarora descent. She was first introduced to music by her father (who is a singer and drummer). The surname Mashonee was a native name given to Jana by her family. Of the Siouan language, the translation means "money belt.

Mahshonee graduated from Davidson College with a degree in psychology, and shortly after got a record deal. First signed to Curb Records, her single, "Ooh, Baby, Baby," was picked as Billboard’s single of the week and went on to become a radio and sales success. "More Than Life" followed, selling over a million copies on its own and as part of numerous compilation albums. A controversial version of Led Zeppelin’s epic "Stairway to Heaven", came next, earning her the honor of being the first Native American to top the Billboard dance charts.

Career
Exploring her cultural roots, Jana then released American Indian Story, a concept album that garnered her a second Grammy nomination. The video for the single, The Enlightened Time, won awards at film festivals around the world as well as a Nammy for Best Short Form Music Video. Music from the album is featured on the Discovery Channel's series, Flying Wild Alaska.

Her first book, American Indian Story – The Adventures of Sha’kona, based on the Grammy nominated album of the same was also recently completed. The fantasy filled mystery-adventure young adult novel is the uplifting story of the young heroine, Sha’kona, and her journey of self-discovery and courage.

Jana continued to pay tribute to her heritage with American Indian Christmas, featuring ten classic Christmas songs sung in ten different Native American languages accompanied by a full orchestra and traditional Native American instruments.  A critical and commercial success, the album won her another Nammy award. On December 16, 2011, she featured some of these songs in an emotional and intimate performance at Carnegie Hall in New York.

New Moon Born took Jana in a new direction, steeped in R&B and gospel roots, which brought her back to mainstream attention. She debuted the featured track, an emotional cover of Sam Cooke's classic, "A Change Is Gonna Come", at the American Indian Inaugural Ball for President Obama. This was her second performance for a First Family. A year earlier she sang at the First Lady's Luncheon for Laura Bush. The song went on to win her an eighth Nammy for Song of the Year and the video took the Best Music Video prizes at the Indie Film Festival and at the American Indian Film Festival.

Jana's tour schedule has brought her to forty nine of the fifty states as well as overseas.
 
Jana is also an actress. In 2012, Jana starred in her first movie Raptor Ranch, which debuted at the Israel Film Festival.  In 2014, it was released on HD-DVD, Redbox, and to select streaming networks under the name The Dinosaur Experiment.

Charity
Her Jana’s Kids Foundation has been helping Native youth through its programs and scholarship offerings. Jana was named 2011 Woman of the Year by "yearofthewoman2011.com" for her philanthropic work. Her philanthropic work extends also to supporting charities such as The Golden Hat Foundation for autism, founded by Kate Winslet.

About her foundation, Jana stated that "I've been blessed to be able to travel across the country to many reservations to talk to youth and address issues of cultural identity and education. From this, I've been able to raise enough money to offer scholarships to deserving Native youth in the artistic, academic, and athletic fields..."

Jana performed with Sarah McLachlan, Loreena McKennitt among other stars to support this charity cause at Carnegie Hall in December 2012.

Personal life
Referring to herself as an "Urban Indian", Jana has stated "From a cultural perspective, I describe myself as an Urban Indian because I am a Native American person who "walks in both worlds" –an expression that refers to Natives who live their lives in the traditional and in the contemporary/modern worlds." Mashonee grew up in a Baptist church and is a self proclaimed Christian, stating she focuses more on exploring spirituality of the Creator than just rules written by men. Jana is currently residing in New York City.

Discography

Albums
Flash of a Firefly (2005) Radikal Records Nammy Award Winner
American Indian Christmas (2005) Standing Stone/SOAR Records Nammy Award Winner
American Indian Story (2006) Standing Stone/SOAR Records Grammy Award nominated
New Moon Born (2010) Miss Molly Records Nammy Award Winner

Singles
"What Am I to You" b/w "Kind of Love" (1997) – Top 40 on the Radio & Records’ rhythmic chart (Curb records)
"Near Me" b/w "The Price" (1998) – A cover of a song originally by the artist Sheryl Crow.  (Curb Records)
"Ooh, Baby, Baby" (1999) - A success on radio and in the Radio & Records, DMA, Hitmakers, and Gavin charts.  Billboard magazine named "Ooh, Baby, Baby" pop Single of the Week in October. (Curb Records)
"More Than Life" (2000) – Reached the Top 10 on Billboard's Artists to Watch chart and peaked in Billboard Magazine's Hot Shot Debut At No. 29. Remixes were made by DJ Skribble and Anthony Acid. (Curb Records)
"Two Out of Three Ain't Bad" (2001) – A cover of a song originally by the artist Meat Loaf. (Curb Records).
"Stairway to Heaven" (2002) - Peaked at No. 7 on Billboard's Hot Dance Singles Sales chart, and was remixed by DJ Skribble and Dave Gadbois. (Radikal Records)
"Found a Love" (2003) – (Radikal Records)
"Do It Mr. DJ" (2004) – (Xtreme Records) (Peter Presta & Jana)
"I'll Be with You" – (Standing Stone/Radikal Records)
"A Change Is Gonna Come" – Miss Molly Records/Sony/Red Music
"Stay with Me Baby" – Miss Molly Records

Awards and nominations
Merit Award 2009 – The Indie Fest for "A Change Is Gonna Come" video
Grammy Award nominations
Nominated – Best Native American Music Album for American Indian Story.
Nominated – Pop/Contemporary Gospel Album. Co-writing on the song "Kiss and Tell" with Crystal Lewis, which appears on Lewis' album Fearless.
Native American Music Awards (NAMMY's)
Best Pop Artist
Best Pop/Rock Recording (More Than Life)
Song of the Year (Stairway to Heaven)
Best Female Artist (Found a Love)
 Record of the Year – Flash of a Firefly
 Best Producer (with Alex Salzman) for Jana's American Indian Christmas
Best Pop Recording (American Indian Story)
Best Short Form Music Video (The Enlightened Time)
Best Producer (with Alex Salzman) for Jana's American Indian Christmas
Song/Single of the Year  "A Change is Gonna Come"
American Indian Film Festival
Best Video "A Change is Gonna Come"
Queens International Film Festival
Winner Best Domestic Music Video (The Enlightened Time)

Acting career

Job as Creative Director 

From January 2010 till June 2016, Jana Mashonee was also Creative Director on the Activation, Inc. in New York, NY.

References

External links 
 janaofficial.com – Jana Mashonee's official website.
 Jana Mashonee at ReverbNation
 [ Jana's] Allmusic.com biography
 SingerUniverse Magazine March Best Vocalist of the Month Winner Jana Mashonee

1980 births
Living people
21st-century American women singers
21st-century Native Americans
American Christians
American film actresses
American women pop singers
Davidson College alumni
Grammy Award winners
Lumbee people
Native American singers
People from Robeson County, North Carolina
Singers from North Carolina
Tuscarora people
21st-century American singers
21st-century Native American women